Anders Nilsson may refer to:

 Anders Nilsson (composer) (born 1954), Swedish composer
 Anders Nilsson (curler) (born 1957), Swedish curler
 Anders Nilsson (director) (born 1963), Swedish director, writer and photographer
 Anders Nilsson (ice hockey) (born 1990), Swedish ice hockey goaltender
 Anders Nilsson (scientist) (born 1956), Swedish scientist
 Anders Nilsson (songwriter) (born 1980), Swedish songwriter, record producer, singer and film critic
 Anders Nilsson (footballer), Swedish footballer

See also
Anders Nielsen (disambiguation)
Anders Nilsen (disambiguation)